Alicja Majewska (born May 30, 1948 in Wrocław, Poland) is a Polish singer. From 1971 to 1974, she was a member of the band Partita as vocalist. In 1975, she received the main award at the National Festival of Polish Song in Opole. She was awarded a Grand Prix at the 1980 festival in Rostock, and was honored in Havana (1985). She received the "Gloria Artis" medal.

Biography 
She spent her early childhood in Olbierzowice, where her parents were teachers.

She is a graduate of the Faculty of Psychology and Pedagogy at the University of Warsaw in the field of andragogy. She made her debut in 1968 at the 4th Soviet Song Festival in Zielona Góra.

Honored with the Bronze (2005) and Gold (2020) Medal "For Merit to Culture Gloria Artis".

From 2019 to 2022, she participated as a trainer in the first three editions of the TVP2 program The Voice Senior.

Discography 
1976 Bywają takie dni
1987 Piosenki Korcza i Młynarskiego
1989 For New Love
1991 Kolędy w teatrze STU – with Halina Frąckowiak  and Andrzej Zaucha
1994 Jeszcze się tam żagiel bieli – The best of
1997 Świat w kolorze nadziei
1999 Być kobietą – Złota kolekcja
2005 Odkryjemy miłość nieznaną
2006 Majewska – Korcz – Live
2006 Idzie kolęda, polska kolęda
2011 Pieśni sakralne
2016 Wszystko może się stać
2019 Żyć się chce

References

External links 
 Official website of singer
 Alicja Majewska in Discogs

1948 births
Living people
Polish women singers
University of Warsaw alumni
Musicians from Wrocław
Recipients of the Gold Medal for Merit to Culture – Gloria Artis
Recipients of the Bronze Medal for Merit to Culture – Gloria Artis